Darren Donnelly (born 28 December 1971) is an English former footballer who played as a forward. He made appearances in The Football League for Blackburn Rovers and Chester City.

Playing career
As a youngster growing up in Skelmersdale, Donnelly joined Blackburn and received press coverage in 1986 after being named best pupil during a course for the Lancashire Schoolboys team.

Donnelly made two league appearances for Blackburn in 1990–91 in the Football League Second Division, before moving to Chester in the summer of 1993 along with fellow Rovers youngsters Ian Berry and Lee Moss. Donnelly would be the only one of the trio to make first team appearances for the Blues, He was a used substitute in nine league games and one Football League Cup matches during 1993–94 as City won promotion from the Football League Third Division.

He did not play professionally again, moving to Holywell Town in the League of Wales.

Honours
Chester City
 Football League Third Division runners–up: 1993–94 (9 apps)

References

Bibliography

1971 births
English footballers
Footballers from Liverpool
English Football League players
Cymru Premier players
Association football forwards
Living people
Blackburn Rovers F.C. players
Chester City F.C. players
Holywell Town F.C. players